Sharafuddeen Bu Ali Shah Qalandar Panipati, renowned as Bu Ali Qalandar (1209–1324 CE), born in Panipat, Haryana, India, was a Qalandar and Sufi saint of the Owaisī Order, who lived and taught in India. His shrine or dargah (mausoleum) is at Bu Ali Shah Qalandar Dargah, Panipat, which is a place of pilgrimage.

His real name was Sharfuddin but he is well known by his title Bu Ali Shah Qalandar. His father Syed Muhammad Abu al Hassan (Fakhar Uddin) also known as Fakhar e Alam was a great scholar and saint of his time. His father was buried in Village Kirman Parachinar, Pakistan. He is from the ancestry of Imam Musa Kazim. His large descendants reside in Pakistan and are known as Nomani. He completed his studies at an early age and subsequently taught near the Qutub Minar in Delhi for 20 years. He published a collection of Persian poetry by the name of "Diwan Hazrat Sharafuddeen Bu Ali Qalandar" which was later translated by Khawaja Shahudin in Punjabi. It was a great Sufi work in Persian language. Some other famous Qalandars include Lal Shahbaz Qalandar and Shams Ali Qalandar.

Birthplace
One account says he was born in early 1209 and lived till 1324 in Panipat, India. His father, Sheikh Fakhar Uddin was a famous scholar of his time. His mother was Hafiza Jamal, the daughter of Maulana Nemat Ullah Hamdani. Some people also claim his father actually came from Iraq and settled down in Panipat.

Tomb
The dargah (mausoleum or shrine), mosque and enclosure at the Qalandar Chowk in Panipat were constructed by Mahabat Khan, a general, in the service of the Mughal Emperor Jahangir. Mahabat Khan's own tomb in red sandstone is adjacent to the saint's mausoleum. The tombs of Hakim Mukaram Khan and the Urdu poet Maulana Altaf Hussain Hali are also located within the enclosure. A nearby structure is the tomb of the last Lodi dynasty ruler of Delhi, Ibrahim Lodi, killed in the First Battle of Panipat (1526).

The left wall of the mausoleum has a qasida (panegyric) embossed and painted in blue and gold, written by Zahuri Neishabouri, who visited India during the reign of Akbar.

A large number of people from all walks of life, Hindus, Muslims, Sikhs and Christians visit the tomb and offer prayers there each Thursday and during the annual Urs Mela.

References

Indian Sufi saints
Sufi saints
People from Panipat
1209 births
1324 deaths
Year of death uncertain